Terenzi is a surname. Notable people with the surname include:

 Antonella Terenzi (born 1965), Italian synchronized swimmer
 Danilo Terenzi (1956–1995), Italian jazz trombonist and composer
 Fiorella Terenzi, Italian-born astrophysicist
 Gianfranco Terenzi (1941-2020), Sammarinese politician
 Marc Terenzi (born 1978), American pop singer 
 Terenzio Terenzi (1575–1621), Italian painter 
 Tonhi Terenzi (born 1969), Italian fencer